Anton Eisgruber (1 November 1912 – 3 July 1994) was a German skier. He competed in the Nordic combined event at the 1936 Winter Olympics.

References

External links
 

1912 births
1994 deaths
German male Nordic combined skiers
Olympic Nordic combined skiers of Germany
Nordic combined skiers at the 1936 Winter Olympics
Sportspeople from Garmisch-Partenkirchen